The military of the Yuan dynasty (1271–1368) were the armed forces of the Yuan dynasty, a fragment of the Mongol Empire created by Kublai Khan in China. The forces of the Yuan were based on the troops that were loyal to Kublai after the Division of the Mongol Empire in 1260. At first this Tamma, a frontier army drawn from all Mongol tribes for conquest of China, had no central organisation but was rather a loose collection of local warlords and Mongol princely armies. However the army was gradually reformed by Kublai Khan into a more systematic force.

Army Organisation

Unlike previous Chinese dynasties that strictly separated military and civilian power, the Yuan administration of military and civil affairs tended to overlap, as a result of traditional Mongol favour for military matters. This was harshly criticised by the Chinese scholar officials at the time. Military officers were allowed to pass on their positions to their sons or grandsons after death, retirement or sometimes even after a promotion. Due to their Mongol background and unlike the previous Chinese dynasties, the Yuan granted feudal fief appanages with serfs throughout North China to military leaders, Mongol, Middle eastern/Central Asian and Han. The conflict between these military nobles with the Imperial government was a persistent feature until the end of the dynasty.

As a fully militarised society the Mongol rulers of the Yuan dynasty attempted to replicate elements of their own military in Chinese society. This was to be accomplished by establishing hereditary military households under the Bureau of Military Affairs that would provide troops for recruitment. Military households were grouped into four segments: Mongolian, Tammachi, Han, and the "Newly Adhered", each with different privileges including grants of stipends, food or tax exemptions. The Tammachi were Mongols and other steppe tribes on the southern edge of Mongolia. Han consisted of the North China forces that joined the Mongols before the 1250s while the "Newly Adhered" consisted of the South China forces that joined during the 1270s. Possibly following the "Mouke" practice of the Jin dynasty, households were also organised into a decimal system (groups of thousand, groups of ten thousand) to provide the necessary manpower and equipment for the military units. This household organisation was first introduced by Chinggis.

There were also military artisan households which provided hereditary services for the production of military equipment such as weapons, armour, siege engines. These were under the command of the military registers. Specialist forces included an artillery army and a crossbow army.

Guards

Yuan Cavalry were mainly Mongols while infantry were mainly Chinese. For his own bodyguards Kublai retained the use of the traditional Mongol Keshig. Kublai created a new Imperial guard force, the suwei, of which half were Chinese and the other half ethnically mixed. By the 1300s even the Keshig were flooded with Chinese recruits. The suwei were initially 6,500 strong but by the end of the dynasty it had become 100,000 strong. They were divided into wei or guards, each recruited from a particular ethnicity. Most wei were Chinese, while a few were Mongols, Koreans, Tungusic peoples, and Central Asians/Middle Easterners including Kipchaks, Alans and even one unit of Russians. The Keshig was converted into an administrative organisation instead.

Han and other North China forces

The Yuan dynasty created a "Han Army" out of defected Jin troops and army of defected Song troops called the "Newly Submitted Army".

The Han units were organised from Chinese warlord forces starting in 1232 under Ogedei Khan, and in 1241, the number of military households constituted 1 out of 7 households in North China, and formed an important element of the Mongol army. While most were peasant militia, some were capable of serving as cavalry forces equal to the Mongols, having been drawn from experienced frontier veterans or former Jin dynasty cavalrymen. The necessary numbers of troops for Kublai Khan's campaigns could only fulfilled by relying on the vast numbers of Southern Chinese soldiers that submitted in the 1270s, especially for naval expeditions which were composed entirely of Chinese and Koreans. Before Kublai, the early Mongol Empire had been accepting of autonomous Chinese warlords as key subordinates, but during the Yuan dynasty, there was considerable backlash from Mongols due to fear of Chinese insurrection, and these hereditary commanders were increasingly restricted. Due to the low status of military professions in China, and exploitation by corrupt administrators, desertion was a massive problem after the death of Kublai Khan.

Southern Song Chinese troops who defected and surrendered to the Mongols were granted Korean women as wives by the Mongols, whom the Mongols earlier took during their invasion of Korea as war booty. The many Song Chinese troops who defected to the Mongols were given oxen, clothes and land by Kublai Khan. As prize for battlefield victories, lands sectioned off as appanages were handed by the Yuan dynasty to Chinese military officers who defected to the Mongol side. The Yuan gave Song Chinese soldiers who defected to the Mongols juntun, a type of military farmland. Cherik soldiers were non-nomad soldiers in the Mongol military. Jin defectors and Han Chinese conscripts were recruited into new armies formed by the Mongols as they destroyed the Jin dynasty and these played a critical role in the defeat of the Jin. Han Chinese defectors led by General Liu Bolin defended Tiancheng from the Jin in 1214 while Genghis Khan was busy going back north. In 1215 Xijing fell to Liu Bolin's army. The original Han cherik forces were created in 1216 and Liu Bolin appointed as their leading officer. As Han troops kept defecting from the Jin to the Mongols the size of Han cherik forces swelled and they had to be partitioned between different units. Han soldiers made up the majority of the Khitan Yelu Tuhua's army, while Juyin soldiers (Khitans,  Tanguts, Ongguds and other vassal tribes) from Zhongdu made up Chalaer's army and Khitan made up Uyar's army. Chalaer, Yelu Tuhua and Uyar led three cherik armies in northern China under the Mongol commander Muqali in addition to his tamma armies in 1217–1218. The first Han armies in the Mongol army were those led by defecting individual officers. There were 1,000 Han (Chinese) troops each in 26 units which made up three tumed arranged by Ogedei Khan on a decimal system. The Han officer Shi Tianze, Han officer Liu Ni and the Khitan officer Xiao Chala, all three of whom defected to the Mongols from the Jin led these three tumed. Chang Jung, Yen Shi and Chung Jou led three additional tumed which were created before 1234. The Han defectors were called the "Black Army" (Hei Jun) by the Mongols before 1235. A new infantry based "New Army" (Xin Jun) was created after the Mongols received 95,000 additional Han soldiers through conscription once the 1236 and 1241 censuses were taken after the Jin was crushed. Han cherik forces were used to fight against Li Tan's revolt in 1262. The New Army and Black Army had hereditary officer posts like the Mongol army itself.

Mongol, other steppe or Central Asian forces

The Mongolian army was under direct command of the Emperor, while Tammachi were under semi-independent Mongol lords. Five Tammachi clans, the touxia, seem to have served the Yuan as allies under their own chiefs. Mongol forces were divided into toumans of 10,000 under a wanhu, divided into minghans of 1,000 under a qianhu, but in practice toumans ranged from 3,000 to 7,000 in strength. 

The Tammachi were organised into Tamma, meaning to govern or control, which were meant as rapid deployment forces stationed in nomadic steppeland but could be quickly mobilised to fight emerging threats. The Tamma were established in Inner Mongolia in 1217/1218 under their first commander Muqali. The Tamma also had attached units of advance scouts known as alginchi, of which there were initially 1,000 such units, stationed in the conquered North China. With the establishment of the Chinese-style Yuan government, the main Tamma became less important while the alginchi units continued to be a part of the occupation forces. The alginchi were crucially kept as mobile cavalry units while the rest of the Mongol forces deep in China were increasingly cut off from their horse supply; even government seizure of horses was insufficient to meet the demand for horses and Mongols were sometimes converted into infantrymen. The Tammachi also included Muslim units from Central Asia, especially the Uyghurs who were given special privileges for being among the earliest to join Genghis Khan. Many of these were stationed in Yunnan to suppress local resistance and campaign against Burma and Vietnam, leading to a Muslim influx there.

Mongols, now living in China, had immense difficulty meeting their military service obligations, as they needed to make a living as farmers and had no pastures to rear horses, having to purchase them at their own expense. By the 1300s many Mongol men could not even foot the cost for travel to enlist in the army. The Yuan army also contained a force known as the Tongshi Jun, which were Mongols who had fought against the Mongols for the Song dynasty.

South China tribal forces
The Mongols made heavy use of indigenous ethnic minority soldiers in southern China rather than Mongols. The Kingdom of Dali's indigenous Cuan-Bo army led by the Duan royal family were the majority of the forces in the Mongol Yuan army sent to attack Song during battles along the Yangtze river. During a Mongol attack against the Song, there were only 3,000 Mongol cavalry at one point under the Mongol commander Uriyangkhadai, the majority of his army were native Cuan-Bo with Duan officers. The Duan forces were instrumental in the Yuan's campaigns against Vietnam and suppressing uprisings in Yunnan. This tradition of Duan royals' service to the Yuan was noted by the succeeding Ming dynasty. The Duan family attempted to use their loyal service record to persuade the Ming to accept them as vassals when the Yuan collapsed.
Other specialist troops were a Miao Army (which was used to garrison Suzhou and Hangzhou in the 1350s), and other tribal forces from Southern China.

Gunpowder weapons
The Yuan dynasty made use of gunpowder weapons such as fire arrows, bombs, and cannons. It also fought with gunpowder armed states such as the Song dynasty during the Siege of Xiangyang. Blocking the Mongols' passage south of the Yangtze were the twin fortress cities of Xiangyang and Fancheng. What resulted was one of the longest sieges the world had ever known, lasting from 1268 to 1273. For the first three years the Song defenders had been able to receive supplies and reinforcements by water, but in 1271 the Mongols set up a full blockade with a formidable navy of their own, isolating the two cities. This didn't prevent the Song from running the supply route anyway, and two men with the surname Zhang did exactly that. The Two Zhangs commanded a hundred paddle wheel boats, travelling by night under the light of lantern fire, but were discovered early on by a Mongol commander. When the Song fleet arrived near the cities, they found the Mongol fleet to have spread themselves out along the entire width of the Yangtze with "vessels spread out, filling the entire surface of the river, and there was no gap for them to enter." Another defensive measure the Mongols had taken was the construction of a chain, which stretched across the water. The two fleets engaged in combat and the Song opened fire with fire-lances, fire-bombs, and crossbows. A large number of men died trying to cut through chains, pull up stakes, and hurl bombs, while Song marines fought hand to hand using large axes, and according to the Mongol record, "on their ships they were up to the ankles in blood." With the rise of dawn, the Song vessels made it to the city walls and the citizens "leapt up a hundred times in joy." In 1273 the Mongols enlisted the expertise of two Muslim engineers, one from Persia and one from Syria, who helped in the construction of counterweight trebuchets. These new siege weapons had the capability of throwing larger missiles further than the previous traction trebuchets. One account records, "when the machinery went off the noise shook heaven and earth; every thing that [the missile] hit was broken and destroyed." The fortress city of Xiangyang fell in 1273.

The next major battle to feature gunpowder weapons was during a campaign led by the Mongol general Bayan, who commanded an army of around two hundred thousand, consisting of mostly Chinese soldiers. It was probably the largest army the Mongols had ever utilized. Such an army was still unable to successfully storm Song city walls, as seen in the 1274 Siege of Shayang. Thus Bayan waited for the wind to change to a northerly course before ordering his artillerists to begin bombarding the city with molten metal bombs, which caused such a fire that "the buildings were burned up and the smoke and flames rose up to heaven." Shayang was captured and its inhabitants massacred.

Gunpowder bombs were used again in the 1275 Siege of Changzhou in the latter stages of the Mongol-Song Wars. Upon arriving at the city, Bayan gave the inhabitants an ultimatum: "if you ... resist us ... we shall drain your carcasses of blood and use them for pillows." This didn't work and the city resisted anyway, so the Mongol army bombarded them with fire bombs before storming the walls, after which followed an immense slaughter claiming the lives of a quarter million. The war lasted for only another four years during which some remnants of the Song held up last desperate defenses. In 1277, 250 defenders under Lou Qianxia conducted a suicide bombing and set off a huge iron bomb when it became clear defeat was imminent. Of this, the History of Song writes, "the noise was like a tremendous thunderclap, shaking the walls and ground, and the smoke filled up the heavens outside. Many of the troops [outside] were startled to death. When the fire was extinguished they went in to see. There were just ashes, not a trace left." So came an end to the Mongol-Song Wars, which saw the deployment of all the gunpowder weapons available to both sides at the time, which for the most part meant gunpowder arrows, bombs, and lances, but in retrospect, another development would overshadow them all, the birth of the gun.

In 1280, a large store of gunpowder at Weiyang in Yangzhou accidentally caught fire, producing such a massive explosion that a team of inspectors at the site a week later deduced that some 100 guards had been killed instantly, with wooden beams and pillars blown sky high and landing at a distance of over 10 li (~2 mi. or ~3 km) away from the explosion, creating a crater more than ten feet deep. One resident described the noise of the explosion as if it "was like a volcano erupting, a tsunami crashing. The entire population was terrified." According to surviving reports, the incident was caused by inexperienced gunpowder makers hired to replace the previous ones, and had been careless while grinding sulfur. A spark caused by the grinding process came into contact with some fire lances which immediately started spewing flames and jetting around "like frightened snakes." The gunpowder makers did nothing as they found the sight highly amusing, that is until one fire lance burst into a cache of bombs, causing the entire complex to explode. The validity of this report is somewhat questionable, assuming everyone within the immediate vicinity was killed.

Hand cannon

Traditionally the first appearance of the hand cannon is dated to the late 13th century, just after the Mongol conquest of the Song dynasty. However a sculpture depicting a figure carrying a gourd shaped hand cannon was discovered among the Dazu Rock Carvings in 1985 by Robin Yates. The sculptures were completed roughly 250 km northwest of Chongqing by 1128, after the fall of Kaifeng to the Jin dynasty. If the dating is correct this would push back the appearance of the cannon in China by a hundred years more than previously thought. The bulbous nature of the cannon is congruous with the earliest hand cannons discovered in China and Europe.

Archaeological samples of the gun, specifically the hand cannon (huochong), have been dated starting from the 13th century. The oldest extant gun whose dating is unequivocal is the Xanadu Gun, so called because it was discovered in the ruins of Xanadu, the Mongol summer palace in Inner Mongolia. The Xanadu Gun is 34.7 cm in length and weighs 6.2 kg. Its dating is based on archaeological context and a straightforward inscription whose era name and year corresponds with the Gregorian Calendar at 1298. Not only does the inscription contain the era name and date, it also includes a serial number and manufacturing information which suggests that gun production had already become systematized, or at least become a somewhat standardized affair by the time of its fabrication. The design of the gun includes axial holes in its rear which some speculate could have been used in a mounting mechanism. Like most early guns with the possible exception of the Western Xia gun, it is small, weighing just over six kilograms and thirty-five centimeters in length. Although the Xanadu Gun is the most precisely dated gun from the 13th century, other extant samples with approximate dating likely predate it.

One candidate is the Heilongjiang hand cannon, discovered in 1970, and named after the province of its discovery, Heilongjiang, in northeastern China. It is small and light like the Xanadu gun, weighing only 3.5 kilograms, 34 cm (Needham says 35 cm), and a bore of approximately 2.5 cm. Based on contextual evidence, historians believe it was used by Yuan forces against a rebellion by Mongol prince Nayan in 1287. The History of Yuan states that a Jurchen commander known as Li Ting led troops armed with hand cannons into battle against Nayan. It reports that the cannons of Li Ting's soldiers "caused great damage," but also created "such confusion that the enemy soldiers attacked and killed each other." The hand cannons were used again in the beginning of 1288. Li Ting's "gun-soldiers" or chongzu were able to carry the hand cannons "on their backs". The passage on the 1288 battle is also the first to coin the name chong with the metal radical jin for metal-barrel firearms. Chong was used instead of the earlier and more ambiguous term huo tong (fire tube), which may refer to the tubes of fire lances, proto-cannons, or signal flares.

Even older, the Ningxia gun was found in Ningxia Hui Autonomous Region by collector Meng Jianmin (孟建民). This Yuan dynasty firearm is 34.6 cm long, the muzzle 2.6 cm in diameter, and weighs 1.55 kilograms. The firearm contains a transcription reading, "Made by bronzesmith Li Liujing in the year Zhiyuan 8 (直元), ningzi number 2565" (銅匠作頭李六徑，直元捌年造，寧字二仟伍百陸拾伍號). Similar to the Xanadu Gun, it bears a serial number 2565, which suggests it may have been part of a series of guns manufactured. While the era name and date corresponds with the Gregorian Calendar at 1271 CE, putting it earlier than both the Heilongjiang Hand Gun as well as the Xanadu Gun, but one of the characters used in the era name is irregular, causing some doubt among scholars on the exact date of production.

Another specimen, the Wuwei Bronze Cannon, was discovered in 1980 and may possibly be the oldest as well as largest cannon of the 13th century: a 100 centimeter 108 kilogram bronze cannon discovered in a cellar in Wuwei, Gansu Province containing no inscription, but has been dated by historians to the late Western Xia period between 1214 and 1227. The gun contained an iron ball about nine centimeters in diameter, which is smaller than the muzzle diameter at twelve centimeters, and 0.1 kilograms of gunpowder in it when discovered, meaning that the projectile might have been another co-viative. Ben Sinvany and Dang Shoushan believe that the ball used to be much larger prior to its highly corroded state at the time of discovery. While large in size, the weapon is noticeably more primitive than later Yuan dynasty guns, and is unevenly cast. A similar weapon was discovered not far from the discovery site in 1997, but much smaller in size at only 1.5 kg. Chen Bingying disputes this however, and argues there were no guns before 1259, while Dang Shoushan believes the Western Xia guns point to the appearance of guns by 1220, and Stephen Haw goes even further by stating that guns were developed as early as 1200. Sinologist Joseph Needham and renaissance siege expert Thomas Arnold provide a more conservative estimate of around 1280 for the appearance of the "true" cannon. Whether or not any of these are correct, it seems likely that the gun was born sometime during the 13th century.

A poem written in 1341 by Zhang Xian describes shells being fired from a cannon:

In 1353, Yuan Mongol forces used huotong (fire tubes) that fired "fire barbs" against the armies of Zhang Shicheng. In 1356, one of the Yuan gunners, Yang Paoshou (Yang "Cannon hand"), defected to Zhu Yuanzhang's side. He led a detachment of hand gunners against the forces of Chen Youliang in 1363. By the time of Jiao Yu and his Huolongjing (a book that describes military applications of gunpowder in great detail) in the mid 14th century, the explosive potential of gunpowder was perfected, as the level of nitrate in gunpowder formulas had risen from a range of 12% to 91%, with at least 6 different formulas in use that are considered to have maximum explosive potential for gunpowder. By that time, the Chinese had discovered how to create explosive round shot by packing their hollow shells with this nitrate-enhanced gunpowder.

Navy

Battles of 1277 involved massive naval forces on both sides. In the last battle near Guangzhou in 1279, which had been the last temporary capital of the Song dynasty, the Yuan captured more than 800 warships.

The Yuan was unusually sea-minded, attempting numerous maritime expeditions. After the Mongol invasions of Japan (1274, 900 ships, and in 1281, 4400 ships), Mongol invasion of Champa (1282), Mongol invasion of Java (1292, 1000 ships), in 1291 the Yuan attempted but did not ultimately proceed with an invasion of the Ryukyu Islands. However, none of these invasions were successful. Kublai contemplated launching a third invasion of Japan but was forced to back down due to fierce public disapproval. The Yuan era naval advances has been described as a successor of the Song dynasty achievements and an antecedent of the Ming's treasure fleets. An important function of the Yuan navy was the shipping of grain from the South to the capital of modern-day Beijing. There was fierce 50-year interdepartmental rivalry between the fleets shipping by the Grand Canal and shipping by the Yellow Sea, which ended with the eventual dominance of the Grand Canal in China until modern times. The failed invasions also demonstrated a weakness of the Mongols – the inability to mount naval invasions successfully.

Shortly after the Mongol invasions of Japan (1274–1281), the Japanese produced a scroll painting depicting a bomb. Called tetsuhau in Japanese, the bomb is speculated to have been the Chinese thunder crash bomb. Archaeological evidence of the use of gunpowder was finally confirmed when multiple shells of the explosive bombs were discovered in an underwater shipwreck off the shore of Japan by the Kyushu Okinawa Society for Underwater Archaeology. X-rays by Japanese scientists of the excavated shells provided proof that they contained gunpowder.

Flags and banners

References

Bibliography
Amitai-Preiss, Reuven. The Mamluk-Ilkhanid War, 1998
 .
 
Chambers, James, The Devil's Horsemen: The Mongol Invasion of Europe. Book Sales Press, 2003.
R.E. Dupuy and T.N. Dupuy -- The Encyclopedia Of Military History: From 3500 B.C. To The Present. (2nd Revised Edition 1986)
Hildinger, Erik -- Warriors of the Steppe: A Military History of Central Asia, 500 B.C. to A.D. 1700. Da Capo Press, 2001. 
Morgan, David -- The Mongols. Wiley-Blackwell, 
Jones Archer -- Art of War in the Western World [1]
 
May, Timothy "The Mongol Art of War."  Westholme Publishing, Yardley. 2007.

 
 .
Nicolle, David -- The Mongol Warlords Brockhampton Press, 1998
Charles Oman -- The History of the Art of War in the Middle Ages (1898, rev. ed. 1953)
 .
 
Saunders, J.J. -- The History of the Mongol Conquests, Routledge & Kegan Paul Ltd, 1971, 
Sicker, Martin -- The Islamic World in Ascendancy: From the Arab Conquests to the Siege of Vienna, Praeger Publishers, 2000
Soucek, Svatopluk -- A History of Inner Asia, Cambridge, 2000
Verbruggen, J.F. -- The Art of Warfare in Western Europe during the Middle Ages, Boydell Press, Second English translation 1997, 
Iggulden, Conn -- Genghis, Birth of an Empire, Bantham Dell.

13th century in China
14th century in China